Ballou House may refer to:

Ballou-Newbegin House, Dublin, New Hampshire
Ballou–Weatherhead House, Cumberland, Rhode Island
Ballou House (Lincoln, Rhode Island)
Angell–Ballou House, Smithfield, Rhode Island
Smith–Ballou House, Woonsocket, Rhode Island